Marcus Berquist (1934 – November 2, 2010) was one of the founders of Thomas Aquinas College, a professor, and an expert on the writings of St. Thomas Aquinas.

He received his bachelor's degree in Philosophy from the College of St. Thomas in St. Paul, Minn. and his licentiate degree in Philosophy from Université Laval in Quebec. He nearly completed his Ph.D. from Université Laval with Charles De Koninck as his mentor but did not due to De Koninck's death.

He taught at Thomas Aquinas College for over thirty-one years.

He is a proponent of angels as described in the Gospels and explains that, "It is only with difficulty and many mistakes that we can come to knowledge of invisible beings, beings that are more real and more alive than bodies."

See also
American philosophy
List of American philosophers

References

External links 
 Thomas Aquinas College.edu: Biography of Marcus Berquist

Thomas Aquinas College faculty
1934 births
2010 deaths
Philosophers from California
Founders of schools in the United States
University and college founders
Université Laval alumni
20th-century philanthropists